Dyschirius carri is a species of ground beetle in the subfamily Scaritinae. It was described by Bousquet in 1996.

References

carri
Beetles described in 1996